Hribi is a dispersed settlement near Trojane in the Municipality of Lukovica in the eastern part of the Upper Carniola region of Slovenia. It includes the hamlets of Hribi and Zapleš (in older sources also Za Plešjo) to the south, Lebenice to the north, and Velika Raven and Drtno to the west.

Name
The name Hribi literally means 'hills', referring to the settlement's terrain. Hribi was attested in written sources as Berg in 1430 and Vhribich in 1571.

References

External links 
 
Hribi on Geopedia

Populated places in the Municipality of Lukovica